Ron Hester (born May 26, 1959) is a former American football linebacker. He played for the Miami Dolphins in 1982.

References

1959 births
Living people
American football linebackers
Florida State Seminoles football players
Miami Dolphins players